John Spalding may refer to:

John Spalding (14th-century MP), English politician
John Spalding (historian), Scottish historian
John Spalding (Ninety Pound Wuss), American musician
John Spalding (priest), Scottish Catholic clergyman
John Spalding (Scottish politician) (1763–1815), Scottish politician
John Franklin Spalding (1828–1902), missionary bishop of the Episcopal Church in the United States
John Lancaster Spalding (1840–1916), American Catholic prelate
John M. Spalding (1914–1959), American military officer and politician
J. Mark Spalding (born 1965), American Catholic prelate

See also 
John Spaulding (disambiguation)